The 2017 RFL Women's Challenge Cup was an English rugby league knockout tournament competed for by 16 teams during the summer of 2017. The competition was won by Bradford Bulls who beat Featherstone Rovers 50–18 in the final on 30 July 2017.

Round of 16
Matches before the quarter finals were played between 9 and 30 April:
Wakefield Trinity 6 – 48 Castleford Tigers
Barrow Raider 12 – 56 Oulton Raiders
Bradford Bulls 92 – 1 Army RL
Leigh Miner Rangers 68 – 6 Whitley Bay Barbarians
Hull Wyke 24 – 40 Stanningley
Hull Wyke 28 – 16 Brighouse Rangers
West Leeds Eagles 14 – 24 York City Knights
East Leeds Academy 10 – 0 Lindley Swift

Quarter Finals
The quarter finals were concluded on 28 May:
Bradford Bulls 64 – 0 Castleford Tigers
Oulton Radiers 6 – 30 Thatto Heath Crusaders 
Featherstone Rovers 50 – 4 Leigh Miner Rangers
Wigan St Patricks 30 – 4 Stanningley

Semi Finals
The semi finals were concluded on 18 June:
Bradford Bulls 30 – 6 Wigan St Patricks
Featherstone Rovers 22 – 10 Thatto Heath Crusaders

Final
The final took place of 30 July:

References

 

 
RFL Women's Challenge Cup
2017 in English rugby league
2017 in English women's sport
2017 in women's rugby league